Akiira Geothermal Limited (AGL), is an electric energy generating company in Kenya. The company owns and will build and operate Akiira One Geothermal Power Station, a proposed , power station in Kenya.

Overview
AGL is a special purpose vehicle formed by the consortium that owns, will design, build and operate Akiira One Geothermal Power Station, scheduled to come online in 2018. In 2014, the company received a US$950,000 grant from OPIC to offset some of the drilling expenses. In March 2016, AGL accepted a grant of KSh138.9 million (approx. US$1.4 million), from the African Union Commission, to mitigate some of the costs of drilling the geothermal wells for the power station, that is on-going since August 2015.

Power stations
AGL owns and operates Akiira One Geothermal Power Station, a 70 megawatt geothermal station to be built in the Greater Olkaria Geothermal Area at a budgeted cost of US$300 million (KSh30 billion). Of that, 70 percent will be borrowed from Standard Bank while the remaining 30 percent will be provided by the shareholders. AGL has already received a KSh86 million grant from the Overseas Private Investment Corporation (OPIC) in October 2014, as part of President Obama’s Power Africa program.

Ownership
Akiira Geothermal Limited owns and will design, build and operate Akiira One Geothermal Power Station. The company is owned by Centum Investment Company Limited and three other non-Kenyan companies. The shareholding in AGL is as depicted in the table below:

See also
 Akiira One Geothermal Power Station

References

External links

Electric power companies of Kenya
Geothermal energy
Companies based in Nairobi
Energy companies established in 2014
Renewable resource companies established in 2014